Wild rye is a common name used for several grasses. Wild ryes belong to any of three genera:

 Elymus (wheatgrasses)
 Leymus  
 Psathyrostachys

Poaceae